The Gilgit Agency was an agency of the British Indian Empire consisting of the subsidiary states of the princely state of Jammu and Kashmir at its northern periphery, mainly with the objective of strengthening these territories against Russian encroachment. The subsidiary states included Hunza, Nagar and other states in the present day districts of Gupis-Yasin, Ghizer, Darel, Tangir and Diamer. The agency headquarters was based in the town of Gilgit, which was itself under the direct administration of the Maharaja of Jammu and Kashmir.

An Officer on Special Duty was established in 1877 in the town of Gilgit, upgraded to a permanent Political Agent in 1889. In 1935, the Gilgit tehsil of the princely state was leased from the Maharaja of Jammu and Kashmir, which also came under the administration of the Political Agent. The Astore tehsil continued to be under the Maharaja's administration. In July 1947, shortly before the independence of India and Pakistan, the Gilgit Leased Area was returned to the Maharaja. However, the Gilgit Scouts rebelled on 1 November 1947 after the accession of Jammu and Kashmir to India, and Pakistan took over the administration of the areas soon thereafter.

Under Pakistani administration, the Gilgit, Astore, and Skardu (Baltistan) tehsils, as well as the subsidiary states previously under the agency, were clubbed together under the name the "Gilgit Agency". The unit remained in existence  till about 1974, when the it was abolished by the Pakistani Prime Minister Zulfiqar Ali Bhutto and turned into Federally Administered Northern Areas (later renamed to "Gilgit-Baltistan").

India continues to claim the entire region of Gilgit-Baltistan as part of the union territory of Ladakh.

Area and borders 

The Gilgit Agency was a political agency for keeping control of the subsidiary states of Jammu and Kashmir at the northern frontier of India. The areas under the Agency consisted of
 the state of Chilas (present day Diamer District) 
 the territories of Darel and Tangir (now their own districts)
 Kuh-Ghizar and Yasin regions (present day Gupis–Yasin district)
 Punial and Ishkoman regions (present day Ghizer district)
 the states of Hunza and Nagar (now their own districts)

All these states had their own rulers or systems of administration; the Agency provided supervision under a British Political Agent.

Until 1935, Gilgit and Astore tehsils (now districts) comprised the Gilgit wazarat of Jammu and Kashmir with its own governor (wazir-e-wazarat), who was also based at Gilgit. However, the Political Agent did exercise some control over the wazarat's affairs, leading to a system of dual rule and causing frictions.

In 1935, the British leased the Gilgit tehsil as the "Gilgit Leased Area". It was administered directly by the Political Agent. The Astore tehsil became its own wazarat, which was administered as part of the Kashmir province of Jammu and Kashmir.

In 1941, the Gilgit Agency had a population of 77,000 and the Gilgit leased area had 23,000. Both the areas together came to be loosely referred to as the 'Gilgit Agency'. The administration of the Agency was carried out "on behalf of His Highness’ Government". The Political Agent communicated with the central government in New Delhi via Peshawar (the capital of the North-West Frontier Province) (instead of the Resident in Kashmir, reportedly for "security" reasons).

The administered area was bounded in the west by the Chitral State, in the northwest by Afghanistan's Wakhan corridor, in the east by Chinese Turkestan, in the south by the Kashmir province, and in the southeast by the Ladakh wazarat of Jammu and Kashmir (which included Baltistan).

History

Antecedents 

During the First Anglo-Sikh War, Maharaja Gulab Singh Jamwal (Dogra) helped the British Empire against the Sikhs. After the defeat of the Sikh Empire, The Treaty of Lahore (9 March 1846) and the Treaty of Amritsar (1846) (16 March 1846) were signed. Under Article IV of The Treaty of Lahore, signed between the  Maharaja Duleep Singh and the British Empire, the Sikhs ceded the territories between the rivers Beas and Indus as war indemnity.

IV. The British Government having demanded from the Lahore State, as indemnification for the expenses of the war, in addition to the cession of territory described in Article 3, payment of one and half crore of Rupees, and the Lahore Government being unable to pay the whole of this sum at this time, or to give security satisfactory to the British Government for its eventual payment, the Maharajah cedes to the Honourable Company, in perpetual sovereignty, as equivalent for one crore of Rupees, all his forts, territories, rights and interests in the hill countries, which are situated between the Rivers Beas and Indus, including the Provinces of Cashmere and Hazarah.

In the north, these territories included Gilgit (the present Gilgit District), Astore (the present Astore District) and Chilas (presently a tehsil of the Diamir District). By 1860, the three areas were constituted as a Gilgit wazarat (district), and the princely states of Hunza and Nagar to the northeast accepted the suzerainty of the Maharaja Ranbir Singh.

The Treaty of Amritsar did not constrain the Maharaja from establishing relationships with external powers, and he is said to have had dealings with Russia, Afghanistan and Chinese Turkestan. The British watched these developments with concern, especially in the light of Russian expansion in the north.

Establishment of the Agency 

Ranbir Singh's successor Pratap Singh was a weak ruler. The British used the opportunity to establish an Agency in Gilgit in 1889, stationing a Political Agent who reported to the British Resident in Srinagar. The initial purpose of the Agency was to keep watch on the frontier and to restrain Hunza and Nagar from dealing with the Russians. Soon afterwards, the states of Hunza and Nagar were brought under the direct purview of the Gilgit Agency. The Jammu and Kashmir State Forces were stationed in a garrison at Gilgit, which were used by the Agency to keep order. They were replaced by a British-officered Gilgit Scouts in 1913.

Gradually, the princely states to the west of Gilgit (Punial, Yasin, Kuh-Ghizar, Ishkoman and Chitral) were also brought under the purview of the Gilgit Agency. These areas were nominally under the suzerainty of Kashmir but were directly administered by the Agency. Following a rebellion 1892, Chitral was transferred to the Malakand Agency in the Frontier Areas. The remaining areas remained under the control of the Gilgit Agency, which administered them through governors.

Inside Pakistan 
The local rulers of these territories continued to appear at the Jammu and Kashmir Durbars until 1947. Following the Partition of India, on 31 October 1947 the British officer William Brown led the Gilgit Scouts in a coup against the Dogra governor of Gilgit which resulted in the region becoming part of Pakistan administered Kashmir. Most of the Ladakh Wazarat, including the Kargil area, became part of Indian-administered Kashmir. The Line of Control established at the end of the war is the current de facto border of India and Pakistan.

Initially, the Gilgit Agency was not absorbed into any of the provinces of West Pakistan, but was ruled directly by political agents of the federal government of Pakistan. In 1963, Pakistan entered into a treaty with China to transfer part of the Gilgit Agency to China, (the Trans-Karakoram Tract), with the proviso that the settlement was subject to the final solution of the Kashmir dispute.

The dissolution of the province of West Pakistan in 1970 was accompanied by change of the name of the Gilgit Agency to the Northern Areas. In 1974, the states of Hunza and Nagar and the independent valleys of Darel-Tangir, which had been de facto dependencies of Pakistan, were also incorporated into the Northern Areas.

Pakistan and India continue to dispute the sovereignty of the territories that had comprised the Gilgit Agency.

See also 

 Old British Cemetery (Gilgit)
 Baltistan
 Gilgit
 Northern Areas
 Kashmir
 Kashmir Conflict
 Trans-Karakoram Tract

Notes

References

Bibliography

External links 

Regions of Gilgit-Baltistan
Agencies of British India
History of Gilgit Agency
History of Gilgit-Baltistan
1877 establishments in India